Jack Stewart is an American politician who has served as the Oklahoma Senate member from the 18th district since November 16, 2022.

Education and career
Stewart graduated from Oklahoma State University in 1974 with a bachelor's degree in civil engineering. Prior to running for the Oklahoma Senate, he served as a Canadian County Commissioner for twelve years, worked for the Oklahoma Department of Transportation for thirty-one years, and served on the Yukon Traffic Commission.

Oklahoma Senate
In 2022, Stewart ran for Oklahoma's 18th senate district. The incumbent Kim David was term limited and he faced Hunter Zearley in the Republican primary. 
He won the election and was sworn in on November 16, 2022.

References

21st-century American politicians
County commissioners in Oklahoma
Living people
Republican Party Oklahoma state senators
Year of birth missing (living people)